Linthal Braunwaldbahn railway station is a railway station in the municipality of Glarus Süd in the Swiss canton of Glarus. It is situated on the Weesen to Linthal railway line in the valley of the Linth river, some  short of the terminus of the line at Linthal station in the village of Linthal. The station opened in 1982 in order to provide a convenient interchange with the Braunwaldbahn funicular to the car-free resort of Braunwald on the mountain above.

The station is served by the hourly Zürich S-Bahn service S25 between Zurich and Linthal (during off-peak hours by S6 service of St. Gallen S-Bahn).

References

External links 
Linthal Braunwaldbahn station on Swiss Federal Railway's web site

Railway stations in the canton of Glarus
Swiss Federal Railways stations